Merten is both a given name and a surname. Notable people with the name include:

Alan G. Merten (born 1941), American official
Bjorn Merten, American football player
Christa Merten (1944–1986), West German athlete
Karl-Friedrich Merten (1905-1993), German U-boat commander
Ken Merten (born 1945), American swimmer
Kenneth H. Merten, American diplomat
Lauri Merten (born 1960), American golfer
Merten de Keyser, French painter

See also
Merten
Mertens

Surnames from given names